As an act of protest, occupation is a strategy often used by social movements and other forms of collective social action in order to squat and hold public and symbolic spaces, buildings, critical infrastructure such as entrances to train stations, shopping centers, university buildings, squares, and parks. Opposed to a military occupation which attempts to subdue a conquered country, a protest occupation is a means to resist the status quo and advocate a change in public policy. Occupation attempts to use space as an instrument in order to achieve political and economic change, and to construct counter-spaces in which protesters express their desire to participate in the production and re-imagination of urban space. Often, this is connected to the right to the city, which is the right to inhabit and be in the city as well as to redefine the city in ways that challenge the demands of capitalist accumulation. That is to make public spaces more valuable to the citizens in contrast to favoring the interests of corporate and financial capital.

Unlike other forms of protest like demonstrations, marches and rallies, occupation is defined by an extended temporality and is usually located in specific places. In many cases local governments declare occupations illegal because protesters seek to control space over a prolonged time. Thus occupations are often in conflict with political authorities and forces of established order, especially the police. These confrontations in particular attract media attention.

Occupation, as a means of achieving change, emerged from worker struggles that sought everything from higher wages to the abolition of capitalism.  Often called a sit-down strike, it is a form of civil disobedience in which an organized group of workers, usually employed at a factory or other centralized location, take possession of the workplace by "sitting down" at their stations, effectively preventing their employers from replacing them with strikebreakers or, in some cases, moving production to other locations.

The recovered factories in Argentina is an example of workplace occupations moving beyond addressing workplace grievances, to demanding a change in ownership of the means of production.

The Industrial Workers of the World were the first American union to use it, while the United Auto Workers staged successful sit-down strikes in the 1930s, most famously in the Flint Sit-Down Strike of 1936–1937.  Sit-down strikes were declared illegal by the US supreme court, but are still used by unions such as the UMWA in the Pittston strike, and the workers at the Republic Windows and Doors factory in Chicago.

The Occupy Wall Street movement, inspired amongst others by the Arab Spring and the Indignados movement of Spain, started a global movement in which the occupation of public spaces is a key tactic. During these protests in 2011, the tactic of occupation was used in a new way as protesters wanted to remain indefinitely until they were heard, resisting police and government officials who wanted to evict them. In contrast to earlier protest encampments these occupations mobilized more people during a longer time period in more cities. This gained them worldwide attention.

Notable protest occupations
2023 University of Manchester protests including ongoing student occupations of University buildings in protest of the marketisation of higher education
2023 storming of the Praça dos Três Poderes
Freedom Convoy 2022 across Canada
2021 Uptown Minneapolis unrest in the U.S. state of Minnesota
2021 Orisha Land following police brutality in Austin, Texas, United States
2021 storming of the United States Capitol
2020 Capitol Hill Autonomous Zone (CHAZ) following the George Floyd protests in the U.S. city of Seattle
2020–present George Floyd Square occupied protest in the U.S. city of Minneapolis
2018 UCU Strike Solidarity Occupations. Student occupations took place on over 20 UK university campuses and the UUK London Offices in support of the 4-week UCU national strike over a pensions dispute. Some occupations lasted for over a month and continued after the strike had ended, calling for an end to the neo-liberalisation and marketisation of higher education and in support of the rights of low-income workers at universities such as cleaners and security guards.
2015 Occupy LSE, a six-week occupation against the neoliberalisation of LSE and the UK Higher Education system.  
2015 University of Amsterdam Bungehuis and Maagdenhuis Occupations, a protest against budget cuts and for more democracy in the University.
2014 Hong Kong protests, an occupation protest for universal suffrage in Hong Kong in 2014
The occupation of the Legislative Yuan of Republic of China (Taiwan) in 2014 as part of the Sunflower Student Movement. 
The several massive occupations of unproductive land in Brazil by the largest mass movement of the world, the Movimento dos Trabalhadores Rurais Sem Terra, from 1973 up to now.
 The 2011–2012 Spanish protests
The occupation of the Wisconsin State Capitol in Madison, Wisconsin in February 2011 as part of the 2011 Wisconsin protests over labor rights, a precursor to the Occupy Wall Street movement.
Occupy Wall Street, which helped spawn the worldwide Occupy movement
Tahrir Square during the 2011 Egyptian revolution
The occupation of some university buildings in the UK in November 2010 and early 2011 in response to cuts by the coalition Conservative-Liberal Democrat government including those to public services, welfare handouts and all levels of education (notably the increase of tuition fees in combination to funding cuts).
The tent city known as "Democracy Village" erected in Parliament Square in London, in 2010.
The wave of Student Occupations at universities in the UK in early 2009.
The occupations of university buildings during the 2009 California college tuition hike protests.
The flux of student occupations at universities in New York City over the 2008-9 year, including NYU and The New School.
The February 2008 occupation of Symphony Way by the Symphony Way Pavement Dwellers after the largest home invasion in South Africa's history.  Residents occupied the main thoroughfare for 1 year and 9 months.
The occupation of Oaxaca City for 150 days during the 2006 Oaxaca protests.
The 2005 Cedar Revolution
The 1990 Wild Lily student movement
The Tiananmen Square protests of 1989.
The Greenham Common Women's Peace Camp in England which began protesting the placement of nuclear-armed cruise missiles in 1981.
The American Indian Movement occupation at Wounded Knee, South Dakota (1973)
The 1969 occupation of Alcatraz by American Indians.
The 1969 occupation of City College by a group consisting largely of Black and Puerto Rican students that demanded and won open admissions at CUNY.
The 1969 student occupation of the computer centre at Sir George Williams University in Montreal.
The 1968 Columbia Student Strike.
 The 1968 Poor People's Campaign, organized (shortly before his assassination) by Martin Luther King Jr. and the Southern Christian Leadership Conference occupation of the National Mall.
 May 13, 1968 - Sorbonne Occupation Committee at the Sorbonne University in Paris
 March 22, 1968 - Movement of 22 March Occupation of Nanterre University 
The 1936-37 GM Sit-Down Strike, in Flint, Michigan.
The 1932 Bonus Army occupation camp of World War I veterans and their families in Washington, D.C.

Tactics
Peace camps conducted on disputed territory such as at Camp Humphreys
Sit-down strikes
Sit-ins

See also
 Squatting

References

External links

Civil disobedience
Activism by type
Protest tactics